B'hoy and g'hal (meant to evoke an Irish pronunciation of boy and gal, respectively) were the prevailing slang words used to describe the young men and women of the rough-and-tumble working class culture of Lower Manhattan in the late 1840s and into the period of the American Civil War. They spoke a slang, with phrases such as "hi-hi", "lam him", and "cheese it".

Etymology
The word b'hoy was first used in 1846. In the United States it was a colloquialism for "spirited lad" and "young spark". The word originates from the Irish pronunciation of boy.

Theatrical examples
The prototypical artistic representation of a b'hoy came in 1848, when Frank Chanfrau played the character Mose the Fireboy in Benjamin A. Baker's A Glance at New York. Mose is a pugilistic Irish volunteer fireman. T. Allston Brown gives this description: He stood there in his red shirt, with his fire coat thrown over his arm, the stovepipe hat —  better known as a "plug" — drawn down over one eye, his trousers tucked into his boots, a stump of a cigar pointing up from his lips to his eye, the soap locks plastered flat on his temples, and his jaw protruded into a half-beastly, half-human expression of contemptuous ferocity. Details varied with each production; some b'hoys were named Sykesy or Syksey, others were butcher's apprentices. Haswell gives a slightly different description of the archetype: a high beaver hat, with the nap divided and brushed in opposite directions, the hair on the back of his head clipped close, while in front the temple locks were curled and greased (hence, the well-known term of 'soap-locks' to the wearer of them), a smooth face, a gaudy silk neckcloth, black frockcoat, full pantaloons, turned up at the bottom over heavy boots designed for service in slaughter houses and at fires; and when thus equipped, with his girl hanging on his arm, it would have been very injudicious to offer him any obstruction or to utter an offensive remark. His girlfriend Lize was the prototypical g'hal, dressed in cheap finery and singing songs from her favorite minstrel shows.

Mose plays became an enormous hit in New York and other large cities, and theaters were filled with b'hoys and g'hals clamoring to see Chanfrau and other actors perform Bowery b'hoy characters. William Northall even complained that at the Olympic Theatre,

See also
 Bowery Boys (gang)
 Bowery B'hoy
 Mose Humphrey

Notes

References
 Allen, Robert C. (1991). Horrible Prettiness: Burlesque and American Culture. University of North Carolina Press.
 Brown, T. Allston (1903). A History of the New York Stage: From the First Performance in 1732 to 1901. Dodd, Mead & Company.
 Cliff, Nigel (2007). The Shakespeare Riots: Revenge, Drama, and Death in Nineteenth-Century America. Random House.
 Lawrence, Vera Brodsky (1988). Strong on Music: The New York Music Scene in the Days of George Templeton Strong. Volume I: Resonances, 1838-1849. University of Chicago Press.
 Lott, Eric (1993). Love and Theft: Blackface Minstrelsy and the American Working Class. New York: Oxford University Press. .
Sante, Luc (2003). Low Life: Lures and Snares of Old New York. Farrar, Straus, & Giroux.
 Wilmeth, Don B., and Bigsby, C. W. E. (1998). The Cambridge History of American Theatre: Beginnings to 1870. New York: Cambridge University Press.
Foster, George G. (1850). "New York by Gas-Light", No. 12, "Mose & Lize". University of Chicago Press, 1990.
Cultural history of New York City
Irish-American culture
Irish-American culture in New York City
History of subcultures